They Too Arise was an early work of Arthur Miller. It was a rewrite of No Villain.

References

1937 plays
Plays by Arthur Miller